Arhopala nobilis  is a butterfly in the family Lycaenidae. It was described by Cajetan Felder in 1860. It is  found  in the Australasian realm

Subspecies
A. n. nobilis (Kai Island, Ambon, Serang, Obi)
A. n. alcestis Grose-Smith, 1902 (Aru, Gebe, West Irian - Papua)
A. n. alce (Hewitson, 1862) (Aru, Halmahera)
A. n. bosnikiana Joicey & Talbot, 1916 (Biak, Noemfoor Island)

References

External links
 Arhopala at Markku Savela's Lepidoptera and Some Other Life Forms

Arhopala
Butterflies described in 1860
Taxa named by Baron Cajetan von Felder
Butterflies of Indonesia
Butterflies of Oceania